The 2010 AFF Championship qualification tournament was held in Vientiane, Laos from 22 to 26 October 2010 for the five lower-ranked teams in Southeast Asia. All teams played in a round-robin tournament format with the winner and runner-up qualifying for the final tournament. However, the qualification was held without Brunei, due to FIFA's continued suspension of the Football Association of Brunei Darussalam, thus barring them from the competition. The draw for the qualifying round and competition proper took place on 15 September 2010.

Venue

Results 
 All times are Indochina Time (ICT) – UTC+7

Goalscorers 
3 goals
  Khim Borey
  Ian Araneta

2 goals

  Kanlaya Sysomvang
  Soukaphone Vongchiengkham
  Phil Younghusband
  Chiquito do Carmo

1 goal

  Nuth Sinoun
  Ketsada Souksavanh
  Konekham Inthammavong
  Kovanh Namthavixay
  Lamnao Singto
  Anton del Rosario
  James Younghusband
  Anggisu Barbosa

References

External links 
 AFF Suzuki Cup 2010 at AseanFootball.org

Qual
2010 in Laotian football
2010
2010 in Cambodian football
2010 in Philippine football
AFF Championship qualification

de:ASEAN-Fußballmeisterschaft 2010#Qualifikation